Muddling Through is an American television sitcom that aired on CBS from July 9, 1994, to September 7, 1994. The series starred Stephanie Hodge as an ex-convict trying to turn her life around, but is now perhaps better remembered for being the series which Jennifer Aniston (playing the daughter of Hodge's character) completed just before her star-making role on Friends began. Friends debuted just two weeks after Muddling Through aired its final episode, with one episode remaining left unaired. According to NBC program executive Preston Beckman ("The Masked Scheduler"), Aniston was in second slot but the first choice to play Rachel Green in Friends. Warren Littlefield, then NBC entertainment chief, ordered the show to be ‘killed’ so that Aniston would be freed up to take on the role of Rachel, leading to NBC to schedule strong programming against it to hurt its ratings.

Plot
Connie Drego is an ex-con, paroled after serving three years in prison for shooting her cheating husband, Sonny, in the buttocks. Connie returns home to work at Drego's Oasis, the family's diner/motel in rural Michigan. Other characters include Madeline, Connie's oldest daughter who is married to Duane Cooper, the cop who arrested Connie and whose testimony led to her conviction, and Kerri, Connie's youngest daughter.

Cast

Starring 

Stephanie Hodge as Connie Drego (10 episodes)
D. David Morin as Sonny Drego (10 episodes)
Jennifer Aniston as Madeline Drego Cooper (10 episodes)
Aimee Brooks as Kerri Drego (10 episodes)
Scott Waara as Duane Cooper (10 episodes)

Recurring 

 Hal Landon Jr. as Gidney (7 episodes)
 Hank Underwood as Lyle (7 episodes)
 Forry Smith as Zane Whitman (2 episodes)

Guest starring 

 Sara Suzanne Brown as Miss Lagermeister
 Blake Clark as Ralph
 Pamela Dunlap as Estelle
 Donald Gibb as Bub
 Linda Hart as Fanny
 Andy Kindler as Beer Distributor
 Don McManus as Nick
 Barbara Sharma as Mrs. Cooper
 Lisa Sundstedt as Attractive Woman
 Richard Venture as Mr. Spivey

Series overview

Episodes

References

External links

CBS original programming
1994 American television series debuts
1994 American television series endings
1990s American sitcoms
English-language television shows
Television shows set in Michigan
Television series by CBS Studios
Television series by Sony Pictures Television